Amherst may refer to:

People
 Amherst (surname), including a list of people with the name
 Earl Amherst of Arracan in the East Indies, a title in the British Peerage; formerly Baron Amherst
 Baron Amherst of Hackney of the City of London, a title in the British Peerage

Places

Australia
Amherst, Victoria

Burma
Kyaikkami, Myanmar, formerly known as Amherst

Canada
Amherst Cove, Newfoundland and Labrador
Middle Amherst Cove, Newfoundland and Labrador
Upper Amherst Cove, Newfoundland and Labrador
Amherst, Nova Scotia
Amherst Head, Nova Scotia
Amherst Internment Camp, Nova Scotia (1915-1919)
Amherst Point, Nova Scotia
Amherst Shore, Nova Scotia
East Amherst, Nova Scotia
West Amherst, Nova Scotia
Amherst Island, Ontario
Amherst Pointe, Ontario
Amherstburg, Ontario
Amherstview, Ontario
Amherst, Quebec
Saint-Rémi-d'Amherst, Quebec
Amherst Island (Nunavut)

United States
Amherst, Colorado
Amherst, Maine
Amherst, Massachusetts
Amherst Center, Massachusetts
Amherst Township, Fillmore County, Minnesota
Amherst, Nebraska
Amherst, New Hampshire, a New England town
Amherst (CDP), New Hampshire, the main village in the town
Amherst, New York, the largest suburb of the city of Buffalo
Amherst, Ohio
Amherst Township, Lorain County, Ohio
Amherst, South Dakota
Amherst, Texas
Amherst, Virginia
Amherst County, Virginia
Amherst (town), Wisconsin
Amherst, Wisconsin, a village in the town

Education 
Amherst Regional Public Schools, in Amherst, Massachusetts, US
Amherst Central High School, in Snyder, Amherst, New York State, US
Amherst College, in Amherst, Massachusetts, US
University of Massachusetts Amherst, in Amherst, Massachusetts, US

Transportation

Cars
 Amherst (automobile), manufactured briefly in Canada

Stations
 Amherst Street station, a subway station in Buffalo, New York
 Amherst station (Massachusetts), a former station in Amherst, Massachusetts, US
 Amherst station (Nova Scotia), a station in Amherst, Nova Scotia, Canada

Other uses
 Fort Amherst (disambiguation), military facilities in England and Canada
 Baron Amherst (disambiguation)
 Amherst Street (disambiguation)
 Amherst Township (disambiguation)

See also

 Amherst Town Hall, Amherst, Ohio, US
 Amherst West Cemetery, Amherst, Mass., US
 Port Amherst, West Virginia, US
 North Amherst, Massachusetts, US
 North Amherst Center Historic District
 East Amherst:
 East Amherst, New York, US
 East Amherst, Nova Scotia, Canada
 West Amherst, Nova Scotia, Canada
 South Amherst (disambiguation)